Las Marthas is a 2014 documentary film directed by Cristina Ibarra, which follows two young women on their journey to their debut in 19th-century-inspired gowns at an event hosted by the Society of Martha Washington.

Synopsis
Las Marthas is a documentary film directed by Cristina Ibarra, who follows two young women, Laurita Garza Hovel—a prominent member of Laredo society—and Rosario Reyes—a newcomer from Mexico—while on their journey to make to their debut at an event hosted by the Society of Martha Washington.

The film displays an, "alternative image of the border-town life" thought documenting the debutante dance where young women wear Colonial style gowns in an effort to portray early American historical figures.

Through various interviews of historians, former "Marthas" and current debutantes, Ibarra tackles the question as to why these young women are embracing a tradition that is honoring a symbol of American conquest from Mexican territories.

Interviews
 Linda Leyendecker Gutierrez, designer of debutantes' gowns
 Rosario Reyes, guest of Las Marthas
 Laura Garza- Hovel, Legacy daughter
 Dr. Norma Cantú, Professor of English and U.S. Latina/o Literature, University of Texas at San Antonio 
 Dr. Josefina Saldaña-Portillo, Director of Undergraduate Studies, Department of Social and Cultural Analysis, New York University

Production
Las Marthas was by the Jerome Foundation, Latino Public Broadcasting, Independent Television Service, Diversity Development Fund and Texas Humanities, and was broadcast nationally  on Independent Lens on February 17, 2014.

Critical reception and reviews
The New York Times called Las Marthas "a striking alternative portrait of border-town life..." According to Charles Ramirez Berg, a professor of film studies at the University of Texas at Austin, Las Marthas "was bucking stereotypes firmly entrenched in the cultural consciousness". The Laredo Sun stated that the film was a "fascinating look as a world barely known outside of Texas..." and Colorlines applauded the film for its ability to "illustrate how an economically fluid reality, defined by new money sometimes from just over the border" is challenged by the "elite past" of Laredo.

Awards
 2014 Jury Award, CineFestival
 Best US Latino Film of the Year, Cinema Tropical 
 2012 Heineken Voces Documentary Award Recipient.

Festivals and screenings
 Ambulante California  
 San Diego Latino Film Festival 
 CineFestival San Antonio
 Chicago Latino Film Festival

Special collections
Latinas in America: Exploring the Latina Experience

References

2014 films
2014 documentary films
Documentary films about women
Documentary films about Mexican Americans
American documentary films
Debutantes
Films shot in Texas
Culture of Laredo, Texas
2010s American films